Aravind Adiga (born 23 October 1974) is an Indian writer and journalist. His debut novel, The White Tiger, won the 2008 Man Booker Prize.

Biography

Early life and education
Aravind Adiga was born in Madras (now Chennai) on 23 October 1974 to Dr. K. Madhava Adiga and Usha Adiga from Mangalore. His paternal grandfather was K. Suryanarayana Adiga, former chairman of Karnataka Bank, and maternal great-grandfather, U. Rama Rao, was a popular medical practitioner and Congress politician from Madras.

Adiga grew up in Mangalore and studied at Canara High School and later at St. Aloysius College, Mangaluru, where he completed his SSLC in 1990.

After emigrating to Sydney with his family, Aravind studied at James Ruse Agricultural High School.  He later studied English literature at Columbia College of Columbia University, in New York City, under Simon Schama, and graduated as salutatorian in 1997. He also studied at Magdalen College, Oxford, where one of his tutors was Hermione Lee.

Career
Aravind Adiga began his career as a financial journalist, interning at the Financial Times.  With pieces published in the Financial Times and Money, he covered the stock market and investment. As a Times correspondent he interviewed US President Donald Trump. His review of previous Booker Prize winner Peter Carey's 1988 book, Oscar and Lucinda, appeared in The Second Circle, an online literary review.

Adiga was subsequently hired by Time, where he remained a South Asia correspondent for three years before going freelance. He wrote The White Tiger during this period. He now lives in Mumbai, Maharashtra, India.

Booker Prize
Adiga's debut novel, The White Tiger, won the 2008 Booker Prize and has been adapted into a Netflix original movie The White Tiger. He is the fourth Indian-born author to win the prize, after Salman Rushdie, Arundhati Roy, and Kiran Desai. V. S. Naipaul, another winner, is ethnically Indian but was born on the Caribbean island of Trinidad. (More recently, Geetanjali Shree won the prize for her novel Tomb of Sand ). The novel studies the contrast between India's rise as a modern global economy and the lead character, Balram, who comes from crushing rural poverty. Adiga explained that just as the "criticism by writers like Flaubert, Balzac and Dickens of the 19th century helped England and France become better societies, "his writing aimed at try[ing] to highlight the brutal injustices of society".

Shortly after he won the prize, it was alleged that Adiga had, the previous year, sacked the agent who secured his contract with Atlantic Books at the 2007 London Book Fair. In April 2009, it was announced that the novel would be adapted into a feature film. Propelled mainly by the Booker Prize win, The White Tigers Indian hardcover edition sold more than 200,000 copies.

Academic criticism 
The novel is described as a first-person Bildungsroman and placed within the wider context of contemporary Indian writing in English, as a novel about "the Darkness" (which reminds us of Dickens's London) and a fascinating success story about the overnight rise of one character from rags to riches, but also about India’s development as a global market economy. Mendes (2010) notices in this a certain artificiality, cleverly masked by irony, and remarks the cardboard cut-out' title character equipped with an inauthentic voice that ultimately undermines issues of class politics" (p. 277). Pakistani blogger Sarmad Iqbal reviewed Adiga's The White Tiger for International Policy Digest, saying: "This novel in multiple ways was an eye opener for me about the rising India as being a Pakistani I grew up listening to and learning nothing good about India. As I got acquainted with all the dark secrets of a rising India divulged by Adiga in this novel, I came across several astonishing similarities between what goes in the 'enemy state' I knew from my childhood and my own country Pakistan."

Other works 
Adiga's second book, Between the Assassinations, was released in India in November 2008 and in the US and UK in mid-2009. His third book, Last Man in Tower, was published in the UK in 2011. His next novel, Selection Day, was published on 8 September 2016. Amnesty published in 2020 speaks of the pathetic condition of immigrants. It was shortlisted for the 2021 Miles Franklin Award.

Bibliography

Novels
 The White Tiger: A Novel. Atlantic Books, Ltd (UK), Free Press (US), 2008
 Between the Assassinations. Picador (IND), 2008
 Last Man in Tower. Fourth Estate (IND), 2011
 Selection Day. HarperCollins India (IND), 2016
 Amnesty. Picador, Pan Macmillan, 2020

Short stories
 "The Sultan's Battery" (The Guardian, 18 October 2008, online text)
 "Smack" (The Sunday Times, 16 November 2008, online text)
 "Last Christmas in Bandra" (The Times, 19 December 2008, online text)
 "The Elephant" (The New Yorker, 26 January 2009, online text)

References

External links

 Official website
 About Aravind Adiga
 Time magazine – Search Results for Aravind Adiga
 Articles by Aravind Adiga for The Second Circle, A Review of Contemporary Literature
 "Aravind Adiga in Conversation with Hirsh Sawhney", The Brooklyn Rail (September 2008)
 "Review of The White Tiger", The Telegraph
 "Novel About India Wins the Man Booker Prize", The New York Times, 14 October 2008
 Article by Aravind Adiga in The Guardian
 

1974 births
Alumni of Magdalen College, Oxford
Indian emigrants to Australia
Booker Prize winners
Columbia College (New York) alumni
Journalists from Karnataka
Indian male novelists
Kannada-language writers
Living people
Mangaloreans
Writers from Mangalore
English-language writers from India
21st-century Indian novelists
People educated at James Ruse Agricultural High School
Novelists from Karnataka
21st-century Indian male writers
Kannada people